Radhakishan Malviya was an Indian politician. He was a member of parliament representing Madhya Pradesh in the Rajya Sabha the upper house of India's Parliament as member of the Indian National Congress.

Political career
He was a prominent Dalit face of MP Congress.  Labour and Parliamentary Affairs minister in Rajiv Gandhi ministry, Member of Parliament for consecutive 18 years, Chairman of Parliament Housing Committee, President of Madhya Pradesh Congress Committee for two terms, President of All India Harijan Sewak Sangh New Delhi which was formed by Mahatma Gandhi, MLA from Sanwer constituency and President of Indore District Congress Committee for 14 years.

Personal life
He has 1 son. Rajendra Malviya, Working Chairman of MP Congress Sc. Department, Chairman Madhya Pradesh Harijan Sewak Sangh, ex. Working committee member of MP Congress and Zila Panchayat Member. He was MLA candidate from Tarana constituency in 2013 and has a grandson Vishal Malviya who is currently chairman  of Indore Janpad Panchayat krishi samiti.

References

External links
 RAJYA SABHA MEMBERS BIOGRAPHICAL SKETCHES 1952-2019

Indian National Congress politicians from Madhya Pradesh
Rajya Sabha members from Madhya Pradesh
Indian National Congress politicians
Politicians from Indore
1943 births
2013 deaths